Tambov Avia was a passenger charter airline based in Tambov, Russia.

Fleet

Legal proceedings

The general manager, Anatoly Aristov, was suspected (in 2009) of illegally receiving over 4 million roubles. Criminal proceedings were launched against him at the request of the three co-founders of the airline.

Bankruptcy

Tambov Avia was declared bankrupt and its license revoked in 2009.

References

Defunct airlines of Russia
Companies based in Tambov Oblast